Julián Ramiro Viáfara Mesa (born May 19, 1978), or simply Viáfara, is a retired Colombian football goalkeeper.

Career

Beginning at Boca Juniors in Tolima and testing 
Son of former player and coach of Colombian U-17 Ramiro Viáfara Quintana, Julián grew up in football. He served in the small schools Boca Juniors de Cali, where he began as forward and also played as defender.

Independiente Medellin 
Eventually signed a contract with Independiente Medellín and premiered on August, taking a penalty in the match.

He was considered one of the main promises of the country and won the league's title with his team. In 1999, with the arrival of René Higuita, Viáfara started the year in reserve, but with the dismissal of Colombian idol by disciplinary problems, rejoined the team and played 33 matches that year. However, in 2000 the team signed José María Pazo and he just played 16 games.

América of Cali 
He signed with América de Cali and made only 10 matches in 2001. In 2002, he was used even less, having played only four matches at the beginning of the tournament.

In 2004 Viáfara appeared on 29 games. In 2006, he remained as the captain of the team despite the crisis that América was living. However, due to delays of wages and unjust punishments to some players at the end of the year, he left the club.

Arrival in Brazil 
In 2007, he goes to Brazil to be hired by the Atlético-PR. Colombian David Ferreira played on the team for two years, and enjoying some success at the time, inspired Atlético to sign another three Colombians: Viáfara, Edwin Valencia and Dayro Moreno. Despite having helped the club get into the Copa Sudamericana and played 19 games, the keeper was withdrawn from the starting lineup the following year, not getting any on the bench in the 2008 Campeonato Paranaense. This situation did not please him, and soon he left the club for Vitória.

Idol in Vitória 
In the second game of the 2008 Brasileirão, against the Sport Recife, Viáfara made a memorable debut. Due to their good performances in the previous season, the Vitória chose to buy the pass of the player in 2009. Vitória won the 2009 Campeonato Baiano, with Viáfara involved in an altercation with Bahia's goalkeeper, Marcelo, after Ramon Menezes scored a last-minute penalty for Vitória in the second leg of the final.

Personal life 
Julian Viáfara  has three daughters, Valerie, Lua and Mariangel. Since its arrival in Salvador, he has been involved in social projects and campaigns to assist underprivileged individuals. For this and other work, he was awarded the title of Citizen of Bahia in late 2010.

Honours
 América de Cali
Copa Mustang: 2001, 2002
 Vitória
Campeonato Baiano: 2009, 2010

Statistics
 As of 7 February 2016

References

External links
CBF 
soccerterminal
placar 
rubronegro 

1978 births
Living people
Association football goalkeepers
Colombian footballers
Colombia international footballers
Colombian expatriate sportspeople in Brazil
Independiente Medellín footballers
América de Cali footballers
Club Athletico Paranaense players
Esporte Clube Vitória players
Patriotas Boyacá footballers
Deportes Quindío footballers
Colombian expatriate footballers
Expatriate footballers in Brazil
Footballers from Cali